The bliss point is the amount of an ingredient such as salt, sugar or fat which optimizes deliciousness (in the formulation of food products).

Description 

Pioneering work on the bliss point was carried out by American market researcher and psychophysicist Howard Moskowitz, known for his successful work in product creation and optimization for foods ranging from spaghetti sauce to soft drinks. Moskowitz used the term, bliss point, to describe "that sensory profile where you like food the most."

The bliss point for salt, sugar, or fat is a range within which perception is that there is neither too much nor too little, but the "just right" amount of saltiness, sweetness, or richness. The human body has evolved to favor foods delivering these tastes: the brain responds with a "reward" in the form of a jolt of endorphins, remembers what we did to get that reward, and makes us want to do it again, an effect run by dopamine, a neurotransmitter. Combinations of sugar, fat, and salt act synergistically, and are more rewarding than any one alone. In food product optimization, the goal is to include two or three of these nutrients at their bliss point.

Applications of the bliss point in the food industry have been criticized for encouraging addiction-like behaviors around eating which may contribute to obesity and other health issues.

See also 
 Beverage industry
 Food industry
 Hyperreality

References

Gustation